BSHM may refer to:

 British Society for the History of Mathematics
 British Society for the History of Medicine